The 1999 New York Yankees season was the 97th season for the Bronx-based Major League Baseball team. The team finished with a record of 98–64 finishing 4 games ahead of the Boston Red Sox. New York was managed by Joe Torre. The Yankees played at Yankee Stadium. In the playoffs, they got to the World Series and defeated the Atlanta Braves in 4 games to win their 25th World Series title. By winning their 25th World Series, the New York Yankees became the most successful team in North America, a record previously held by the NHL's Montreal Canadiens. In that year, free-to-air broadcasts returned to WNYW, the which had been the first Yankees television broadcaster in 1947, while cable broadcasts continued on MSG.

Offseason

November 10, 1998: Scott Brosius resigned as a free agent with the New York Yankees.
November 11, 1998: David Cone resigned as a free agent with the New York Yankees.
November 25, 1998: Bernie Williams resigned as a free agent with the New York Yankees.
February 5, 1999: Jeff Juden was signed as a free agent with the New York Yankees.
February 18, 1999: Roger Clemens  was traded by the Toronto Blue Jays to the New York Yankees for Homer Bush, Graeme Lloyd, and David Wells.
March 30, 1999: Izzy Molina was traded by the Arizona Diamondbacks with Ben Ford to the New York Yankees for Darren Holmes and cash.

Notable transactions
April 5, 1999: Darryl Strawberry signed as a free agent with the New York Yankees.
July 31, 1999: Jim Leyritz was traded by the San Diego Padres to the New York Yankees for Geraldo Padua (minors).

Season standings

Record vs. opponents

Season summary

David Cone's perfect game
July 18, 1999 – The Yankees won 6-0 in Interleague Play against the Montreal Expos, which was also pitcher David Cone's perfect game. The perfect game was the last shutout he would throw in his career.

Line score
July 18, Yankee Stadium, New York

Box score

Batting

Pitching

Record vs. opponents

Detailed records

Roster

Game log

|-  style="background:#fbb;"
| 1 || April 5 || @ Athletics || 3–5  || Mathews (1–0) || Stanton (0–1) || || Network Associates Coliseum || 46,380 || 0–1
|-  style="background:#bfb;"
| 2 || April 6 || @ Athletics || 7–4 || Hernandez (1–0) || Candiotti (0–1) || Rivera (1) || Network Associates Coliseum || 15,579 || 1–1
|-  style="background:#bfb;"
| 3 || April 7 || @ Athletics || 4–0 || Mendoza (1–0) || Haynes (0–1) || || Network Associates Coliseum || 18,846 || 2–1
|-  style="background:#bfb;"
| 4 || April 9 || Tigers || 12–3  || Cone (1–0) || Graterol (0–1) || || Yankee Stadium|| 56,583 || 3–1
|-  style="background:#bfb;"
| 5 || April 10 || Tigers || 5–0 || Clemens (1–0) || Moehler (1–1) || || Yankee Stadium || 42,058 || 4–1
|-  style="background:#bfb;"
| 6 || April 11 || Tigers || 11–2 || Hernandez (2–0) || Thompson (0–2) || || Yankee Stadium || 32,398 || 5–1
|-  style="background:#bfb;"
| 7 || April 13 || Orioles || 6–3 || Nelson (1–0) || Rhodes (0–1) || || Yankee Stadium || 25,254 || 6–1
|-  style="background:#bfb;"
| 8 || April 14 || Orioles || 14–7 || Cone (2–0) || Erickson (0–2) || || Yankee Stadium || 26,898 || 7–1
|-  style="background:#fbb;"
| 9 || April 15 || Orioles || 7–9 || Rhodes (1–1) || Rivera (0–1) || Timlin (3) || Yankee Stadium || 30,958 || 7–2
|-  style="background:#fbb;"
| 10 || April 16 || @ Tigers || 1–8 || Thompson (1–2) || Hernandez (2–1) || || Tiger Stadium || 14,816 || 7–3
|-  style="background:#fbb;"
| 11 || April 17 || @ Tigers || 1–3 || Anderson (1–0) || Nelson (1–1) || Jones (1) || Tiger Stadium || 17,821 || 7–4
|-  style="background:#fbb;"
| 12 || April 18 || @ Tigers || 1–5 || Mlicki (1–1) || Mendoza (1–1) || || Tiger Stadium || 16,503 || 7–5
|-  style="background:#bfb;"
| 13 || April 20 || Rangers || 4–0 || Cone (3–0) || Burkett (0–2) || || Yankee Stadium || 24,514 || 8–5
|-  style="background:#bfb;"
| 14 || April 21 || Rangers || 4–2 || Clemens (2–0) || Helling (0–3) || Rivera (2) || Yankee Stadium || 23,984 || 9–5
|-  style="background:#bfb;"
| 15 || April 23 || Blue Jays || 6–4 || Hernandez (3–1) || Wells (3–1) || Rivera (3) || Yankee Stadium || 36,529 || 10–5
|-  style="background:#bfb;"
| 16 || April 24 || Blue Jays || 7–4 || Mendoza (2–1) || Plesac (0–1) || Rivera (4) || Yankee Stadium || 46,924 || 11–5
|-  style="background:#bfb;"
| 17 || April 25 || Blue Jays || 4–3  || Grimsley (1–0) || Person (0–1) || || Yankee Stadium || 51,903 || 12–5
|-  style="background:#bfb;"
| 18 || April 27 || @ Rangers || 7–6 || Stanton (1–1) || Wetteland (0–1) || Rivera (5) || The Ballpark in Arlington || 42,690 || 13–5
|-  style="background:#fbb;"
| 19 || April 28 || @ Rangers || 6–8 || Munoz (1–0) || Stanton (1–2) || Wetteland (7) || The Ballpark in Arlington || 33,038 || 13–6
|-  style="background:#bfb;"
| 20 || April 29 || @ Rangers || 5–3 || Mendoza (3–1) || Morgan (4–1) || Rivera (6) || The Ballpark in Arlington || 35,573 || 14–6
|-  style="background:#fbb;"
| 21 || April 30 || @ Royals || 6–13 || Morman (1–0) || Pettitte (0–1) || || Kauffman Stadium || 29,054 || 14–7

|-  style="background:#bfb;"
| 22 || May 1 || @ Royals || 8–4 || Cone (4–0) || Pittsley (1–1) || || Kauffman Stadium || 29,692 || 15–7
|-  style="background:#bfb;"
| 23 || May 2 || @ Royals || 9–8 || Grimsley (2–0) || Santiago (1–2) || Rivera (7) || Kauffman Stadium || 24,666 || 16–7
|-  style="background:#fbb;"
| 24 || May 3 || @ Royals || 3–9 || Service (1–0) || Hernandez (3–2) || || Kauffman Stadium || 18,021 || 16–8
|-  style="background:#fbb;"
| 25 || May 4 || @ Twins || 5–8 || Lincoln (1–4) || Mendoza (3–2) || Aguilera (5) || Hubert H. Humphrey Metrodome || 15,923 || 16–9
|-  style="background:#bfb;"
| 26 || May 5 || @ Twins || 5–3 || Pettitte (1–1) || Hawkins (1–5) || Rivera (8) || Hubert H. Humphrey Metrodome || 17,859 || 17–9
|-  style="background:#bfb;"
| 27 || May 6 || @ Twins || 4–3  || Grimsley (3–0) || Aguilera (3–1) || Rivera (9) || Hubert H. Humphrey Metrodome || 16,465 || 18–9
|-  style="background:#bfb;"
| 28 || May 7 || Mariners || 10–1 || Irabu (1–0) || Suzuki (0–1) || || Yankee Stadium || 38,476 || 19–9
|-  style="background:#fbb;"
| 29 || May 8 || Mariners || 5–14 || Garcia (4–1) || Hernandez (3–3) || || Yankee Stadium || 41,786 || 19–10
|-  style="background:#bfb;"
| 30 || May 9 || Mariners || 6–1 || Grimsley (4–0) || Fassero (1–4) || || Yankee Stadium || 49,622 || 20–10
|-  style="background:#fbb;"
| 31 || May 11 || Angels || 7–9 || Petkovsek (3–1) || Mendoza (3–3) || Percival (6) || Yankee Stadium || 25,313 || 20–11
|-  style="background:#fbb;"
| 32 || May 12 || Angels || 0–1 || Finley (2–3) || Cone (4–1) || Percival (7) || Yankee Stadium || 23,540 || 20–12
|-  style="background:#fbb;"
| 33 || May 13 || Angels || 0–2 || Olivares (4–3) || Irabu (1–1) || Percival (8) || Yankee Stadium || 26,702 || 20–13
|-  style="background:#fbb;"
| 34 || May 14 || White Sox || 2–8 || Parque (5–2) || Hernandez (3–4) || Simas (1) || Yankee Stadium || 33,793 || 20–14
|-  style="background:#fbb;"
| 35 || May 15 || White Sox || 4–12 || Snyder (6–1) || Mendoza (3–4) || || Yankee Stadium || 45,824 || 20–15
|-  style="background:#bfb;"
| 36 || May 16 || White Sox || 2–1 || Pettitte (2–1) || Sirotka (1–5) || Rivera (10) || Yankee Stadium || 51,046 || 21–15
|-  style="background:#fbb;"
| 37 || May 18 || @ Red Sox || 3–6 || Martinez (8–1) || Cone (4–2) || Gordon (5) || Fenway Park || 33,620 || 21–16
|-  style="background:#fbb;"
| 38 || May 19 || @ Red Sox || 0–6 || Rose (1–0) || Irabu (1–2) || || Fenway Park || 32,091 || 21–17
|-  style="background:#bfb;"
| 39 || May 20 || @ Red Sox || 3–1 || Hernandez (4–4) || Portugal (3–2) || Rivera (11) || Fenway Park || 33,139 || 22–17
|-  style="background:#bfb;"
| 40 || May 22  || @ White Sox || 10–2 || Clemens (3–0) || Snyder (6–2) || || Comiskey Park II || || 23–17
|-  style="background:#fbb;"
| 41 || May 22 || @ White Sox || 1–2 || Sirotka (2–5) || Pettitte (2–2) || Simas (2) || Comiskey Park II || 35,310 || 23–18
|-  style="background:#bfb;"
| 42 || May 23 || @ White Sox || 8–7  || Rivera (1–1) || Simas (0–1) || || Comiskey Park II || 22,845 || 24–18
|-  style="background:#fbb;"
| 43 || May 25 || Red Sox || 2–5 || Rose (2–0) || Irabu (1–3) || Gordon (8) || Yankee Stadium || 37,715 || 24–19
|-  style="background:#bfb;"
| 44 || May 26 || Red Sox || 8–3 || Hernandez (5–4) || Portugal (3–3) || Rivera (12) || Yankee Stadium || 45,800 || 25–19
|-  style="background:#bfb;"
| 45 || May 27 || Red Sox || 4–1 || Clemens (4–0) || Rapp (2–3) || Rivera (13) || Yankee Stadium || 27,631 || 26–19
|-  style="background:#bfb;"
| 46 || May 28 || @ Blue Jays || 10–6 || Pettitte (3–2) || Carpenter (3–5) || || SkyDome || 30,355 || 27–19
|-  style="background:#bfb;"
| 47 || May 29 || @ Blue Jays || 8–3 || Cone (5–2) || Hentgen (4–3) || || SkyDome || 40,175 || 28–19
|-  style="background:#bfb;"
| 48 || May 30 || @ Blue Jays || 8–3 || Irabu (2–3) || Wells (5–5) || || SkyDome || 39,111 || 29–19
|-  style="background:#fbb;"
| 49 || May 31 || Indians || 1–7 || Nagy (6–3) || Hernandez (5–5) || || Yankee Stadium || 46,605 || 29–20

|-  style="background:#bfb;"
| 50 || June 1 || Indians || 11–5 || Clemens (5–0) || Burba (5–2) || || Yankee Stadium || 32,759 || 30–20
|-  style="background:#fbb;"
| 51 || June 2 || Indians || 7–10 || Karsay (5–1) || Pettitte (3–3) || Jackson (11) || Yankee Stadium || 36,955 || 30–21
|-  style="background:#bfb;"
| 52 || June 4 || Mets || 4–3 || Grimsley (5–0) || Reed (3–3) || Rivera (14) || Yankee Stadium || 56,175 || 31–21
|-  style="background:#bfb;"
| 53 || June 5 || Mets || 6–3 || Hernandez (6–5) || Yoshii (5–5) || Rivera (15) || Yankee Stadium || 55,935 || 32–21
|-  style="background:#fbb;"
| 54 || June 6 || Mets || 2–7 || Leiter (3–5) || Clemens (5–1) || || Yankee Stadium || 56,294 || 32–22
|-  style="background:#fbb;"
| 55 || June 7 || @ Phillies || 5–6 || Byrd (8–3) || Pettitte (3–4) || || Veterans Stadium || 37,180 || 32–23
|-  style="background:#fbb;"
| 56 || June 8 || @ Phillies || 5–11 || Perez (3–1) || Grimsley (5–1) || || Veterans Stadium || 44,444 || 32–24
|-  style="background:#bfb;"
| 57 || June 9 || @ Phillies || 11–5 || Cone (6–2) || Ogea (3–4) || || Veterans Stadium || 42,047 || 33–24
|-  style="background:#bfb;"
| 58 || June 11 || @ Marlins || 8–4 || Hernandez (7–5) || Meadows (5–6) || Rivera (16) || Pro Player Stadium || 40,161 || 34–24
|-  style="background:#bfb;"
| 59 || June 12 || @ Marlins || 5–4 || Clemens (6–1) || Hernandez (3–6) || Rivera (17) || Pro Player Stadium || 42,110 || 35–24
|-  style="background:#fbb;"
| 60 || June 13 || @ Marlins || 2–8 || Fernandez (2–3) || Pettitte (3–5) || || Pro Player Stadium || 39,639 || 35–25
|-  style="background:#bfb;"
| 61 || June 14 || Rangers || 8–2 || Irabu (3–3) || Clark (3–6) || || Yankee Stadium || 27,812 || 36–25
|-  style="background:#bfb;"
| 62 || June 15 || Rangers || 6–2 || Cone (7–2) || Glynn (0–1) || || Yankee Stadium || 28,200 || 37–25
|-  style="background:#fbb;"
| 63 || June 16 || Rangers || 0–3 || Helling (6–6) || Hernandez (7–6) || Wetteland (22) || Yankee Stadium || 28,555 || 37–26
|-  style="background:#fbb;"
| 64 || June 17 || Rangers || 2–4 || Sele (7–5) || Clemens (6–2) || Wetteland (23) || Yankee Stadium || 30,157 || 37–27
|-  style="background:#bfb;"
| 65 || June 18 || Angels || 4–1 || Pettitte (4–5) || Finley (4–7) || Rivera (18) || Yankee Stadium || 39,996 || 38–27
|-  style="background:#bfb;"
| 66 || June 19 || Angels || 6–2 || Irabu (4–3) || Olivares (6–5) || Mendoza (1) || Yankee Stadium || 49,408 || 39–27
|-  style="background:#fbb;"
| 67 || June 20 || Angels || 2–4 || Belcher (5–6) || Cone (7–3) || Percival (19) || Yankee Stadium || 55,626 || 39–28
|-  style="background:#bfb;"
| 68 || June 22 || @ Devil Rays || 7–0 || Hernandez (8–6) || Witt (3–4) || || Tropicana Field || 30,290 || 40–28
|-  style="background:#bfb;"
| 69 || June 23 || @ Devil Rays || 12–4 || Clemens (7–2) || Eiland (0–3) || || Tropicana Field || 30,474 || 41–28
|-  style="background:#bfb;"
| 70 || June 24 || @ Devil Rays || 7–3 || Pettitte (5–5) || Rekar (5–3) || Mendoza (2) || Tropicana Field || 30,499 || 42–28
|-  style="background:#bfb;"
| 71 || June 25 || @ Orioles || 9–8 || Naulty (1–0) || Timlin (3–6) || Rivera (19) || Oriole Park at Camden Yards || 47,936 || 43–28
|-  style="background:#bfb;"
| 72 || June 26 || @ Orioles || 7–4 || Cone (8–3) || Johnson (1–2) || Rivera (20) || Oriole Park at Camden Yards || 47,841 || 44–28
|-  style="background:#bfb;"
| 73 || June 27 || @ Orioles || 6–2 || Hernandez (9–6) || Ponson (7–5) || || Oriole Park at Camden Yards || 48,020 || 45–28
|-  style="background:#bfb;"
| 74 || June 29 || Tigers || 3–0 || Clemens (8–2) || Thompson (6–8) || || Yankee Stadium || 31,338 || 46–28
|-  style="background:#fbb;"
| 75 || June 30 || Tigers || 2–8 || Moehler (7–8) || Pettitte (5–6) || || Yankee Stadium || 39,749 || 46–29

|-  style="background:#bfb;"
| 76 || July 1 || Tigers || 6–0 || Irabu (5–3) || Mlicki (3–9) || || Yankee Stadium || 26,311 || 47–29
|-  style="background:#bfb;"
| 77 || July 2 || Orioles || 2–1 || Cone (9–3) || Johnson (1–3) || Rivera (21) || Yankee Stadium || 37,518 || 48–29
|-  style="background:#bfb;"
| 78 || July 3 || Orioles || 6–5 || Grimsley (6–1) || Rhodes (3–4) || || Yankee Stadium || 42,859 || 49–29
|-  style="background:#fbb;"
| 79 || July 4 || Orioles || 3–7 || Guzman (4–6) || Mendoza (3–5) || Kamieniecki (2) || Yankee Stadium || 37,046 || 49–30
|-  style="background:#fbb;"
| 80 || July 5 || Orioles || 1–9 || Mussina (10–4) || Pettitte (5–7) || || Yankee Stadium || 29,934 || 49–31
|-  style="background:#bfb;"
| 81 || July 6 || @ Tigers || 9–8  || Rivera (2–1) || Jones (1–3) || Mendoza (3) || Tiger Stadium || 23,785 || 50–31
|-  style="background:#fbb;"
| 82 || July 7 || @ Tigers || 4–6 || Mlicki (4–9) || Cone (9–4) || Brocail (2) || Tiger Stadium || 28,844 || 50–32
|-  style="background:#bfb;"
| 83 || July 8 || @ Tigers || 3–2 || Hernandez (10–6) || Nitkowski (1–3) || Rivera (22) || Tiger Stadium || 34,417 || 51–32
|-  style="background:#fbb;"
| 84 || July 9 || @ Mets || 2–5 || Leiter (8–6) || Clemens (8–3) || Benitez (6) || Shea Stadium || 53,820 || 51–33
|-  style="background:#fbb;"
| 85 || July 10 || @ Mets || 8–9 || Mahomes (3–0) || Rivera (2–2) || || Shea Stadium || 53,792 || 51–34
|-  style="background:#bfb;"
| 86 || July 11 || @ Mets || 6–3 || Irabu (6–3) || Hershiser (9–6) || Rivera (23) || Shea Stadium || 53,869 || 52–34
|- style="background:#bbcaff;"
| colspan=10 | 70th All-Star Game in Boston, Massachusetts
|-  style="background:#fbb;"
| 87 || July 15 || Braves || 2–6 || Glavine (8–8) || Clemens (8–4) || || Yankee Stadium || 49,087 || 52–35
|-  style="background:#fbb;"
| 88 || July 16 || Braves || 7–10 || Springer (1–1) || Rivera (2–3) || Rocker (18) || Yankee Stadium || 50,469 || 52–36
|-  style="background:#bfb;"
| 89 || July 17 || Braves || 11–4 || Pettitte (6–7) || Perez (4–6) || Grimsley (1) || Yankee Stadium || 55,785 || 53–36
|-  style="background:#bfb;"
| 90 || July 18 || Expos || 6–0 || Cone (10–4) || Vazquez (2–5) || || Yankee Stadium || 41,930 || 54–36
|-  style="background:#fbb;"
| 91 || July 19 || Expos || 4–6 || Kline (4–2) || Mendoza (3–6) || Urbina (20) || Yankee Stadium || 23,404 || 54–37
|-  style="background:#bfb;"
| 92 || July 20 || Expos || 7–4 || Clemens (9–4) || Thurman (3–7) || Rivera (24) || Yankee Stadium || 28,801 || 55–37
|-  style="background:#bfb;"
| 93 || July 21 || Devil Rays || 4–3 || Hernandez (11–6) || Witt (5–6) || Rivera (25) || Yankee Stadium || 27,566 || 56–37
|-  style="background:#bfb;"
| 94 || July 22 || Devil Rays || 5–4 || Pettitte (7–7) || Rekar (6–6) || Rivera (26) || Yankee Stadium || 40,557 || 57–37
|-  style="background:#bfb;"
| 95 || July 23 || Indians || 9–8  || Grimsley (7–1) || Jackson (3–4) || || Yankee Stadium || 52,704 || 58–37
|-  style="background:#bfb;"
| 96 || July 24 || Indians || 21–1 || Irabu (7–3) || Langston (1–1) || || Yankee Stadium || 54,870 || 59–37
|-  style="background:#bfb;"
| 97 || July 25 || Indians || 2–1 || Mendoza (4–6) || Rincon (0–2) || || Yankee Stadium || 54,944 || 60–37
|-  style="background:#bfb;"
| 98 || July 27 || @ White Sox || 5–3 || Hernandez (12–6) || Baldwin (4–11) || Rivera (27) || Comiskey Park II || 21,364 || 61–37
|-  style="background:#fbb;"
| 99 || July 28 || @ White Sox || 3–11 || Castillo (1–0) || Pettitte (7–8) || || Comiskey Park II || 22,523 || 61–38
|-  style="background:#fbb;"
| 100 || July 29 || @ White Sox || 1–5 || Snyder (8–6) || Cone (10–5) || Foulke (5) || Comiskey Park II || 24,056 || 61–39
|-  style="background:#bfb;"
| 101 || July 30 || @ Red Sox || 13–3 || Irabu (8–3) || Portugal (6–8) || || Fenway Park || 33,777 || 62–39
|-  style="background:#fbb;"
| 102 || July 31 || @ Red Sox || 5–6 || Lowe (2–2) || Mendoza (4–7) || || Fenway Park || 33,179 || 62–40

|-  style="background:#fbb;"
| 103 || August 1 || @ Red Sox || 4–5 || Saberhagen (7–4) || Hernandez (12–7) || Wakefield (14) || Fenway Park || 33,553 || 62–41
|-  style="background:#bfb;"
| 104 || August 2 || Blue Jays || 3–1 || Pettitte (8–8) || Wells (11–7) || Rivera (28) || Yankee Stadium || 40,825 || 63–41
|-  style="background:#fbb;"
| 105 || August 3 || Blue Jays || 1–3 || Hamilton (4–6) || Cone (10–6) || Koch (22) || Yankee Stadium || 43,110 || 63–42
|-  style="background:#bfb;"
| 106 || August 4 || Blue Jays || 8–3 || Irabu (9–3) || Escobar (9–8) || || Yankee Stadium || 52,833 || 64–42
|-  style="background:#bfb;"
| 107 || August 5 || @ Mariners || 7–4 || Clemens (10–4) || Moyer (10–6) || Rivera (29) || Safeco Field || 45,190 || 65–42
|-  style="background:#bfb;"
| 108 || August 6 || @ Mariners || 11–8 || Watson (3–3) || Fassero (4–13) || Rivera (30) || Safeco Field || 45,262 || 66–42
|-  style="background:#bfb;"
| 109 || August 7 || @ Mariners || 1–0 || Pettitte (9–8) || Garcia (11–7) || Rivera (31) || Safeco Field || 45,202 || 67–42
|-  style="background:#bfb;"
| 110 || August 8 || @ Mariners || 9–3 || Cone (11–6) || Halama (9–3) || || Safeco Field || 45,195 || 68–42
|-  style="background:#bfb;"
| 111 || August 9 || @ Athletics || 12–8 || Mendoza (5–7) || Haynes (7–11) || || Network Associates Coliseum || 24,896 || 69–42
|-  style="background:#fbb;"
| 112 || August 10 || @ Athletics || 1–6 || Olivares (10–9) || Clemens (10–5) || Jones (6) || Network Associates Coliseum || 32,474 || 69–43
|-  style="background:#bfb;"
| 113 || August 11 || @ Athletics || 5–3 || Watson (4–3) || Jones (3–4) || Rivera (32) || Network Associates Coliseum || 43,683 || 70–43
|-  style="background:#bfb;"
| 114 || August 13 || Twins || 14–2 || Pettitte (10–8) || Hawkins (8–9) || || Yankee Stadium || 44,568 || 71–43
|-  style="background:#fbb;"
| 115 || August 14 || Twins || 3–6 || Wells (7–1) || Cone (11–7) || Trombley (20) || Yankee Stadium || 55,179 || 71–44
|-  style="background:#fbb;"
| 116 || August 15 || Twins || 3–5 || Radke (9–11) || Irabu (9–4) || Trombley (21) || Yankee Stadium || 56,180 || 71–45
|-  style="background:#bfb;"
| 117 || August 16 || Twins || 2–0 || Clemens (11–5) || Milton (4–10) || Rivera (33) || Yankee Stadium || 36,503 || 72–45
|-  style="background:#bfb;"
| 118 || August 17 || Royals || 5–2 || Hernandez (13–7) || Rosado (7–10) || Rivera (34) || Yankee Stadium || 31,631 || 73–45
|-  style="background:#fbb;"
| 119 || August 18 || Royals || 0–3 || Reichert (2–1) || Pettitte (10–9) || Montgomery (6) || Yankee Stadium || 38,947 || 73–46
|-  style="background:#fbb;"
| 120 || August 19 || Royals || 1–4  || Rigby (4–6) || Grimsley (7–2) || Montgomery (7) || Yankee Stadium || 42,325 || 73–47
|-  style="background:#bfb;"
| 121 || August 20 || @ Twins || 9–3 || Irabu (10–4) || Radke (9–12) || Nelson (1) || Hubert H. Humphrey Metrodome || 23,595 || 74–47
|-  style="background:#fbb;"
| 122 || August 21 || @ Twins || 1–6 || Milton (5–10) || Clemens (11–6) || Guardado (2) || Hubert H. Humphrey Metrodome || 32,170 || 74–48
|-  style="background:#bfb;"
| 123 || August 22 || @ Twins || 5–3 || Hernandez (14–7) || Mays (5–6) || Rivera (35) || Hubert H. Humphrey Metrodome || 26,150 || 75–48
|-  style="background:#bfb;"
| 124 || August 23 || @ Rangers || 21–3 || Pettitte (11–9) || Burkett (4–7) || || The Ballpark in Arlington || 38,024 || 76–48
|-  style="background:#bfb;"
| 125 || August 24 || @ Rangers || 10–7  || Mendoza (6–7) || Lee (0–1) || Rivera (36) || The Ballpark in Arlington || 39,727 || 77–48
|-  style="background:#fbb;"
| 126 || August 25 || @ Rangers || 3–7 || Loaiza (7–1) || Irabu (10–5) || || The Ballpark in Arlington || 38,345 || 77–49
|-  style="background:#bfb;"
| 127 || August 27 || Mariners || 8–0 || Clemens (12–6) || Meche (4–4) || || Yankee Stadium || 51,985 || 78–49
|-  style="background:#bfb;"
| 128 || August 28 || Mariners || 2–1 || Rivera (3–3) || Paniagua (6–10) || || Yankee Stadium || 54,787 || 79–49
|-  style="background:#bfb;"
| 129 || August 29 || Mariners || 11–5 || Pettitte (12–9) || Abbott (5–1) || Rivera (37) || Yankee Stadium || 52,493 || 80–49
|-  style="background:#bfb;"
| 130 || August 30 || Athletics || 7–4 || Nelson (2–1) || Mathews (8–4) || Rivera (38) || Yankee Stadium || 32,712 || 81–49
|-  style="background:#fbb;"
| 131 || August 31 || Athletics || 2–3  || Jones (5–5) || Mendoza (6–8) || Isringhausen (3) || Yankee Stadium || 33,746 || 81–50

|-  style="background:#fbb;"
| 132 || September 1 || Athletics || 1–7 || Olivares (13–9) || Clemens (12–7) || || Yankee Stadium || 34,468 || 81–51
|-  style="background:#bfb;"
| 133 || September 2 || Athletics || 9–3 || Hernandez (15–7) || Heredia (11–6) || || Yankee Stadium || 33,147 || 82–51
|-  style="background:#fbb;"
| 134 || September 3 || @ Angels || 2–8 || Belcher (6–8) || Pettitte (12–10) || || Edison Field || 35,782 || 82–52
|-  style="background:#bfb;"
| 135 || September 4 || @ Angels || 9–6 || Watson (5–3) || Alvarez (0–1) || Rivera (39) || Edison Field || 30,589 || 83–52
|-  style="background:#bfb;"
| 136 || September 5 || @ Angels || 8–3 || Yarnall (1–0) || Fyhrie (0–4) || || Edison Field || 35,481 || 84–52
|-  style="background:#fbb;"
| 137 || September 6 || @ Angels || 3–5 || Washburn (1–3) || Clemens (12–8) || Percival (27) || Edison Field || 31,749 || 84–53
|-  style="background:#fbb;"
| 138 || September 7 || @ Royals || 3–6 || Rosado (8–13) || Cone (11–8) || Montgomery (9) || Kauffman Stadium || 14,207 || 84–54
|-  style="background:#bfb;"
| 139 || September 8 || @ Royals || 9–5 || Hernandez (16–7) || Rusch (0–1) || Rivera (40) || Kauffman Stadium || 15,247 || 85–54
|-  style="background:#fbb;"
| 140 || September 10 || Red Sox || 1–3 || Martinez (21–4) || Pettitte (12–11) || || Yankee Stadium || 55,239 || 85–55
|-  style="background:#fbb;"
| 141 || September 11 || Red Sox || 10–11 || Garces (5–1) || Irabu (10–6) || Beck (9) || Yankee Stadium || 55,422 || 85–56
|-  style="background:#fbb;"
| 142 || September 12 || Red Sox || 1–4 || Cormier (2–0) || Clemens (12–9) || Beck (10) || Yankee Stadium || 56,028 || 85–57
|-  style="background:#fbb;"
| 143 || September 13 || @ Blue Jays || 1–2 || Wells (14–10) || Hernandez (16–8) || || SkyDome || 30,118 || 85–58
|-  style="background:#bfb;"
| 144 || September 14 || @ Blue Jays || 10–6 || Mendoza (7–8) || Koch (0–4) || || SkyDome || 29,140 || 86–58
|-  style="background:#bfb;"
| 145 || September 15 || @ Blue Jays || 6–4 || Pettitte (13–11) || Hentgen (10–11) || Rivera (41) || SkyDome || 29,460 || 87–58
|-  style="background:#bfb;"
| 146 || September 16 || @ Indians || 9–5 || Irabu (11–6) || Burba (14–8) || || Jacobs Field || 43,054 || 88–58
|-  style="background:#bfb;"
| 147 || September 17 || @ Indians || 9–4 || Clemens (13–9) || Wright (7–9) || || Jacobs Field || 43,029 || 89–58
|-  style="background:#fbb;"
| 148 || September 18 || @ Indians || 4–5 || Nagy (17–9) || Hernandez (16–9) || Jackson (37) || Jacobs Field || 43,002 || 89–59
|-  style="background:#bfb;"
| 149 || September 19 || @ Indians || 11–7 || Watson (6–3) || Martin (0–1) || || Jacobs Field || 42,969 || 90–59
|-  style="background:#bfb;"
| 150 || September 21 || White Sox || 3–1 || Pettitte (14–11) || Baldwin (10–13) || Rivera (42) || Yankee Stadium || 29,248 || 91–59
|-  style="background:#bfb;"
| 151 || September 22 || White Sox || 5–4 || Rivera (4–3) || Navarro (8–13) || || Yankee Stadium || 27,549 || 92–59
|-  style="background:#bfb;"
| 152 || September 23 || White Sox || 5–2 || Clemens (14–9) || Parque (9–14) || Rivera (43) || Yankee Stadium || 33,586 || 93–59
|-  style="background:#bfb;"
| 153 || September 24 || Devil Rays || 4–3  || Stanton (2–2) || Charlton (2–3) || || Yankee Stadium || 44,932 || 94–59
|-  style="background:#fbb;"
| 154 || September 25 || Devil Rays || 1–2 || Arrojo (7–11) || Cone (11–9) || Hernandez (41) || Yankee Stadium || 50,403 || 94–60
|-  style="background:#fbb;"
| 155 || September 26 || Devil Rays || 5–6 || Lidle (1–0) || Mendoza (7–9) || Hernandez (42) || Yankee Stadium || 49,458 || 94–61
|-  style="background:#fbb;"
| 156 || September 27 || Devil Rays || 6–10 || Duvall (1–1) || Irabu (11–7) || Sparks (1) || Yankee Stadium || 41,355 || 94–62
|-  style="background:#bfb;"
| 157 || September 28 || @ Orioles || 9–5 || Mendoza (8–9) || Ponson (12–12) || || Oriole Park at Camden Yards || 44,711 || 95–62
|-  style="background:#fbb;"
| 158 || September 30  || @ Orioles || 0–5 || Mussina (18–7) || Clemens (14–10) || || Oriole Park at Camden Yards || 44,568 || 95–63
|-  style="background:#bfb;"
| 159 || September 30  || @ Orioles || 12–5 || Hernandez (17–9) || Corsi (1–3) || || Oriole Park at Camden Yards || 47,446 || 96–63

|-  style="background:#bfb;"
| 160 || October 1 || @ Devil Rays || 11–7 || Mendoza (9–9) || Arrojo (7–12) || Rivera (44) || Tropicana Field || 27,248 || 97–63
|-  style="background:#bfb;"
| 161 || October 2 || @ Devil Rays || 3–2 || Cone (12–9) || Alvarez (9–9) || Rivera (45) || Tropicana Field || 40,756 || 98–63
|-  style="background:#fbb;"
| 162 || October 3 || @ Devil Rays || 2–6 || Gaillard (1–0) || Juden (0–1) || Hernandez (43) || Tropicana Field || 31,292 || 98–64

Postseason Game log

|-  style="background:#bfb;"
| 1 || October 5 || Rangers || 8–0 || Hernandez (1–0) || Sele (0–1) || || Yankee Stadium || 57,099 || 1–0
|-  style="background:#bfb;"
| 2 || October 7 || Rangers || 3–1 || Pettitte (1–0) || Helling (0–1) || Rivera (1) || Yankee Stadium || 57,485 || 2–0
|-  style="background:#bfb;"
| 3 || October 9 || @ Rangers || 3–0 || Clemens (1–0) || Loaiza (0–1) || Rivera (2) || The Ballpark in Arlington || 50,269 || 3–0

|-  style="background:#bfb;"
| 1 || October 13 || Red Sox || 4–3 || Rivera (1–0) || Beck (0–1) || || Yankee Stadium || 57,181 || 1–0
|-  style="background:#bfb;"
| 2 || October 14 || Red Sox || 3–2 || Cone (1–0) || Martinez (0–1) || Rivera (3) || Yankee Stadium || 57,180 || 2–0
|-  style="background:#fbb;"
| 3 || October 16 || @ Red Sox || 1–13 || Martinez (2–0) || Clemens (1–1) || || Fenway Park || 33,190 || 2–1
|-  style="background:#bfb;"
| 4 || October 17 || @ Red Sox || 9–2 || Pettitte (2–0) || Saberhagen (0–2) || Rivera (4) || Fenway Park || 33,586 || 3–1
|-  style="background:#bfb;"
| 5 || October 18 || @ Red Sox || 6–1 || Hernandez (2–0) || Mercker (0–1) || Mendoza (1) || Fenway Park || 33,589 || 4–1

|-  style="background:#bfb;"
| 1 || October 23 || @ Braves || 4–1 || Hernandez (3–0) || Maddux (1–2) || Rivera (5) || Turner Field || 51,342 || 1–0
|-  style="background:#bfb;"
| 2 || October 24 || @ Braves || 7–2 || Cone (2–0) || Millwood (2–1) || || Turner Field || 51,226 || 2–0
|-  style="background:#bfb;"
| 3 || October 26 || Braves || 6–5  || Rivera (2–0) || Remlinger (0–2) || || Yankee Stadium || 56,794 || 3–0
|-  style="background:#bfb;"
| 4 || October 27 || Braves || 4–1 || Clemens (2–1) || Smoltz (1–1) || Rivera (6) || Yankee Stadium || 56,752 || 4–0

Player stats

Batting

Starters by position
Note: Pos = Position; G = Games played; AB = At bats; H = Hits; Avg. = Batting average; HR = Home runs; RBI = Runs batted in

Other batters
Note: G = Games played; AB = At bats; H = Hits; Avg. = Batting average; HR = Home runs; RBI = Runs batted in

Pitching

Starting pitchers
Note: G = Games pitched; IP = Innings pitched; W = Wins; L = Losses; ERA = Earned run average; SO = Strikeouts

Other pitchers
Note: G = Games pitched; IP = Innings pitched; W = Wins; L = Losses; ERA = Earned run average; SO = Strikeouts

Relief pitchers
Note: G = Games pitched; IP = Innings pitched; W = Wins; L = Losses; SV = Saves; ERA = Earned run average; SO = Strikeouts

ALDS

Series Summary:
Game 1 @ Yankee Stadium: Yankees 8, Rangers 0
Game 2 @ Yankee Stadium: Yankees 3, Rangers 1
Game 3 @ The Ballpark in Arlington: Yankees 3, Rangers 0

ALCS

New York wins the series, 4-1

World series

Game 1
October 23, 1999, at Turner Field in Atlanta.

Game 2
October 24, 1999, at Turner Field in Atlanta

Game 3
October 26, 1999, at Yankee Stadium in New York City

Game 4
October 27, 1999, at Yankee Stadium in New York City

Awards and honors
 Orlando Hernández, Pitcher, ALCS MVP
 Mariano Rivera, Relief Pitcher, World Series MVP
 Derek Jeter, American League Leader in Hits, 219 Hits

1999 All-Star Game
 David Cone, pitcher, reserve
 Derek Jeter, shortstop, reserve
 Mariano Rivera, relief pitcher, reserve
 Bernie Williams, outfield, reserve

In popular culture
In the 1995 Star Trek: Deep Space Nine episode "Past Tense", a character from the 2020s called the 1999 New York Yankees the best team he had ever seen.  While it could be argued the 1998 team was better, it is considered remarkable that a television program that aired in 1995 could have even predicted such a successful season for a specific team.

Farm system

References

1999 New York Yankees at Baseball Reference
1999 World Series
1999 New York Yankees at Baseball Almanac
David Cone Perfect Game Box Score

New York Yankees seasons
New York Yankees
New York Yankees
1990s in the Bronx
American League East champion seasons
American League champion seasons
World Series champion seasons